Henrickson is a surname. Notable people with the surname include:

Bonnie Henrickson, the head women's college basketball coach at the University of Kansas
Clifford A. Henricksen, musician, inventor and audio technologist
James Solberg Henrickson (born 1940), American botanist
Lance Henriksen (born 1940), American actor and artist

Fictional characters on the HBO series Big Love
Barbara Henrickson
Ben Henrickson
Bill Henrickson
Sarah Henrickson

See also
Hendrickson (disambiguation)
Henrikson